Trauma is an American heavy metal band formed in 1981. The band is best known for having bassist Cliff Burton in its initial lineup, who would later leave the band to join Metallica.

The group disbanded in 1985 before re-establishing itself after twenty-eight years (2013) around original vocalist Donny Hillier and returning drummer Kris Gustofson.

On September 28, 2020, Hillier passed away following an undisclosed illness; he was replaced by vocalist Brian Allen nearly a year later on August 24, 2021.

On December 6, 2022, Marty Friedman and Trauma were announced as special guests for Queensrÿche's 2023 Digital Noise Alliance Tour; on February 21, 2023, Casey Trask was named as substitute rhythm guitarist for Joe Fraulob on that tour.

Its current line-up consists of members Gustofson, Steve Robello, Allen and Michael Spencer, with Trask as their touring rhythm guitarist.

Band members

Current members
 Kris Gustofson – drums 
 Steve Robello – bass , lead guitar, backing vocals  
 Brian Allen – lead vocals 
 Michael Spencer – bass 
 Casey Trask - live rhythm guitar, backing vocals

Former members
 Donny Hillier – lead vocals  
 Michael Overton – rhythm guitar 
 (George) Tiger Lady – lead guitar 
 Cliff Burton – bass  
 Dennis Shafer – drums 
 Lucas Advicula – bass 
 Ross Alexander – lead guitar 
 Glen Gordon – bass 
 Kurt Fry – guitars 
 Marcel Eaton – bass 
 Jeff Jones – lead guitar 
 Bobby Cannon – rhythm guitar 
 Greg Christian – bass 
 Joe Fraulob – rhythm guitar, backing vocals

Timeline

Discography
 Scratch and Scream (1984)
 Rapture and Wrath (2015)
 As the World Dies (2018)
 Awakening (2022)

See also
 List of bands from the San Francisco Bay Area
 List of heavy metal bands
 List of thrash metal bands

References

External links

 Official Facebook page
 Official SoundCloud page

1981 establishments in California
American power metal musical groups
American speed metal musical groups
Heavy metal musical groups from California
Musical groups established in 1981
Musical groups from San Francisco
Musical quintets
Thrash metal musical groups from California